Ansel Tracy Walling (January 10, 1824 – June 22, 1896) was an American lawyer and politician who served one term as a U.S. Representative from Ohio from 1875 to 1877.

Early life and career 
Born in Otsego County, New York, Walling moved to Erie County, Pennsylvania, where he attended a local academy.  He studied medicine and practiced a short time, and then learned the art of printing.  He moved to Ohio in 1843 and engaged in newspaper work.  He served as clerk of the Ohio General Assembly in 1851 and 1852.  He then studied law, was admitted to the bar in 1852 and practiced.  He moved to Keokuk, Iowa, and was editor of the Daily Times 1855-1858.  

He served as delegate to the 1856 Democratic National Convention.  He returned to Ohio in 1861 and settled in Circleville, where he resumed the practice of law.  He served as member of the Ohio Senate in 1865.  He served in the Ohio House of Representatives in 1867 and was elected speaker pro tempore.

Congress 
Walling was elected as a Democrat to the Forty-fourth Congress (March 4, 1875 – March 3, 1877).  He was an unsuccessful candidate for renomination.  

He again engaged in the practice of law.

Death
He died in Circleville, Ohio, June 22, 1896, and was interred in Forest Cemetery.

Walling's house in Circleville has been well preserved to the present day; it is listed on the National Register of Historic Places.

References

External links

 

|-

|-

|-

1824 births
1896 deaths
People from Otsego County, New York
People from Circleville, Ohio
Ohio lawyers
Ohio state senators
Members of the Ohio House of Representatives
19th-century American newspaper editors
American male journalists
19th-century American male writers
19th-century American politicians
Journalists from New York (state)
Journalists from Ohio
19th-century American lawyers
 Democratic Party members of the United States House of Representatives from Ohio